William Herbert Purvis (November 27, 1858 – December 31, 1950) was a plant collector and investor in a sugarcane plantation on the island of Hawaii during the late nineteenth century.

William Herbert Purvis (also known as Herbert Purvis) was born in Sussex, England. He and his father John Purvis (1820–1909) came to Hawaii in 1878.
A distant cousin, Edith Mary Winifred Purvis, also came to Hawaii and married into the Holdsworth family; their daughter married into the Greenwell family (early Kona coffee merchants) and had daughter Amy B. H. Greenwell (1920–1974). Edith's brothers were Robert William Theodore, a businessman on Kauai, and Edward William Purvis who served as King Kalakaua's vice chamberlain.

The Purvis family were early investors in the Pacific Sugar Mill at Kukuihaele near Waipio Valley on the northeast coast "Big Island" of Hawaii.
The lands were from the estate of King Lunalilo, consolidated by Purvis and the royal doctor Georges Phillipe Trousseau.

In 1882, Purvis introduced macadamia seeds into the Hawaiian Islands after he visited Australia. For many years, the trees were grown just as ornamental plants. Macadamias have since become an important tree crop in Hawaii. Major macadamia production is on the island of Hawaii.

Purvis introduced the mongoose to control rats at the plantation in 1883. The mongoose has become an invasive pest.
In 1889 he was elected into the Royal Colonial Institute.

In 1887, Purvis hired Scottish arboriculturalist David McHattie Forbes from his position as Foreman Forester of the estate of Fletcher's Saltoun Hall to import and cultivate cinchona trees above the sugar line in Kukuihaele, Hawaii at the Pacific Sugar Mill.

He married Mabel Vida Turner and had at least four children: Arthur Frederic Purvis (1890–1955),  Inez Adele Isobel Kapuaimohala Purvis (1891–1961), John Ralph Purvis (1894–1915), and Herbert Charles Purvis (1897–1945).
He died December 31, 1950.

References

1858 births
1950 deaths
19th-century American Episcopalians
Businesspeople from Hawaii
Hawaiian Kingdom people